André Castro Pereira (born 2 April 1988), known as Castro, is a Portuguese professional footballer who plays for S.C. Braga as a central midfielder.

Formed at Porto, where he was mainly loaned out, he spent most of his career in Turkey, making 227 Süper Lig appearances and scoring 26 goals for Kasımpaşa and Göztepe.

Club career

Porto
Born in Gondomar, Porto District, Castro joined FC Porto's youth system at the age of 11, from hometown club Gondomar SC. In 2007, he helped the team conquer the junior championship.

Castro made his first-team – and Primeira Liga – debut on 2 February 2008, coming on as a substitute for Paulo Assunção for the last 11 minutes of a 4–0 home win against U.D. Leiria. He appeared in a further two official matches during the season.

In the following two years, Castro played with S.C. Olhanense on loan, helping the Algarve side returned to the top division after an absence of more than 30 years in his debut campaign and winning several Best Young Player monthly awards during his second, where he scored six goals in 28 games as his team retained their status.

Castro returned to Porto for 2010–11, but was soon deemed surplus to requirements by new manager André Villas-Boas as practically all Portuguese players. In January 2011, after having totalled 106 minutes in six competitive matches, he was loaned to Sporting de Gijón in Spain, making his La Liga debut on the 23rd by playing one minute in a 1–0 home victory over Atlético Madrid.

Castro managed to feature regularly for the Asturians during his spell, starting 11 times and scoring against RCD Mallorca (4–0, away) and Getafe CF (2–0 at home), in an eventual escape from relegation. In mid-August 2011, another loan spell was arranged. He started in 26 of his 29 league appearances and added another two goals, but his team dropped down a tier.

Turkey
On 14 August 2013, Castro joined Turkish Süper Lig club Kasımpaşa S.K. on loan. The move was made permanent for the 2014–15 season. On 6 May 2017, he scored twice in a 3–1 win at Galatasaray SK.

Castro signed a three-year contract with Göztepe S.K. of the same league on 8 July 2017. He scored four times in his first year, adding nine assists to help to a sixth-place finish one year after promotion.

Braga
On 28 July 2020, Castro returned to his own country's top flight, on a two-year deal at S.C. Braga. Counting two goals and four assists to his name from 66 games, he renewed for a further year at its conclusion.

International career
Castro earned 57 caps for Portugal across all youth levels, including 19 for the under-21s. On 5 August 2011, he was called by the full side for a friendly with Luxembourg, but remained an unused substitute.

Career statistics

Honours
Porto
Primeira Liga: 2007–08, 2010–11, 2012–13
Taça de Portugal: 2010–11
Supertaça Cândido de Oliveira: 2012
UEFA Europa League: 2010–11
Taça da Liga runner-up: 2012–13

Olhanense
Segunda Liga: 2008–09

Braga
Taça de Portugal: 2020–21

References

External links

1988 births
Living people
People from Gondomar, Portugal
Sportspeople from Porto District
Portuguese footballers
Association football midfielders
Primeira Liga players
Liga Portugal 2 players
FC Porto players
S.C. Olhanense players
S.C. Braga players
La Liga players
Sporting de Gijón players
Süper Lig players
Kasımpaşa S.K. footballers
Göztepe S.K. footballers
Portugal youth international footballers
Portugal under-21 international footballers
Portuguese expatriate footballers
Expatriate footballers in Spain
Expatriate footballers in Turkey
Portuguese expatriate sportspeople in Spain
Portuguese expatriate sportspeople in Turkey